This is a list of notable Danish musicians and singers:

The list

A
 Afenginn
 Alphabeat
 Aqua, peaked in 1997 with "Barbie Girl"
 Artillery

B
 Bamses Venner
 Julie Berthelsen, singer
 Bikstok Røgsystem
 Birmingham 6
 The Blue Van
 Victor Borge
 Brixx
 Dieterich Buxtehude (1637–1707), composer

C
 C21
 Debbie Cameron
 Henrik Carlsen
 Carpark North
 The Cartoons
 Tim Christensen
 Ida Corr

D
 typpi
 Anna David
 Daze
 Lonnie Devantier
 Tina Dickow, singer
 René Dif, singer, member of Aqua
 Aura Dione
 Dizzy Mizz Lizzy
 DJ Encore
 Dominus
 DQ
 Danish Quartet
 Dreamers' Circus

E
 Efterklang
 Amir El-Falaki
 Michael Elo, composer
 Evil Masquerade

F

 Bent Fabricius-Bjerre
 Fate
 Fielfraz
 Figurines
 Sharin Foo
 Anders Frandsen
 Lars Frederiksen, vocalist of Rancid

G
 Jacob Gade
 Niels W. Gade
 Gangway
 Gasolin'
 Susanne Georgi, one half of Me & My
 Lukas Graham
 Peder Gram (1881–1956), composer

H
 Lars Hannibal, lutenist
 Hatesphere
 Caroline Henderson
 Hit'n'Hide
 Jullie Hjetland
 Horrorpops
 Hot Eyes
 Hurdy Gurdy
 Húsakórið (Faroese/Danish)

I
 Illdisposed
 Infernal
 Grethe Ingmann
 Jørgen Ingmann

J
 Knud Jeppesen (1892–1974)
 Jokeren
 Junior Senior

K
 Kølig Kaj
 Kashmir
 King Diamond (born 1956)
 Birthe Kjær
 Anders Kjølholm
 Kliché
 Klutæ
Kalibre

L
 Laban
 Laid Back
 Jon Larsen
 Kim Larsen
 Late Night Venture 
 Lazyboy
 Leæther Strip
 Anne Linnet
 Hans Christian Lumbye

M

 Frederik Magle (born 1977), pianist, organist, and composer
 Malene Mortensen
 Malk de Koijn
 Manticora
 MC Einar, rap band
 Me & My
 Mercenary
 Mercyful Fate
 Mew
 Michael Learns to Rock
 Christine Milton
 Anila Mirza (born 1974), singer
 Miss Papaya
 Mnemic
 Mofus
 John Mogensen
 MØ

N
 The Naked
 Nanna
 Nekromantix
 Nephew
 Carl Nielsen (1865–1931), composer
 Nik og Jay
 Claus Norreen, composer
 Rasmus Nøhr
 Per Nørgård
Niarn

O
 Agnes Obel
 Oh Land
 Oh No Ono
 Olsen Brothers
Lee Oskar
 Outlandish

P
 Parzival
 Pegboard Nerds, consisting of a Danish and a Norwegian DJ
 Michael Poulsen
 Pretty Maids
 Psyched Up Janis
 Pyramaze
Pede B

R
 Lina Rafn
 Søren Nystrøm Rasted, composer
 Raunchy
 The Raveonettes
 Simon Ravn, film composer
 Remee, composer
 Bryan Rice
 Ridin' Thumb
 Rollo & King
 Rune RK

S
 Natasja Saad
 Safri Duo
 Sanne Salomonsen
 Savage Rose
 Saybia
 Aksel Schiøtz, tenor
 Hannah Schneider
 Sebastian
 Rasmus Seebach
 Tommy Seebach
 Liselotte Selbiger, harpsichordist
 Sidsel Ben Semmane
 Shu-Bi-Dua
 S.O.A.P.
 Sort Sol
 Spleen United
 Superheroes
 Jakob Sveistrup
 Bent Sørensen

T
 Tiggy
 Toy-Box
 Trentemøller
 Thomas Troelsen
 TV-2
 Tobias Aaen Sørensen

U
 Lars Ulrich (born 1963), drummer in Metallica
 Under Byen

V
 Alex Vargas
 Volbeat

W

 Sune Rose Wagner
 Christopher Ernst Friedrich Weyse
 Whigfield
 Birthe Wilke
 Gustav Winckler

See also
 List of Danes
 List of Danish actors
 Lists of musicians

Danish